Malvern St James is an independent school for girls in Great Malvern, Worcestershire, England. Founded in 1893 as Malvern Girls' College, it was renamed Malvern St James following a merger in 2006 with St James's School in West Malvern. It continues to occupy the same campus as the former college, which includes as its main building the former Imperial Hotel, taken over for use as a school by Malvern Girls' College in 1919.

The school comprises three sections: a Prep Department for girls aged 4–11, a Senior School for girls aged 11–16, and a Sixth Form for girls aged 16–18.

History

Two schools
Malvern Girls' College was founded in 1893 by Miss Greenslade and Miss Poulton, and was first located in College Road.

In 1919 they acquired the Imperial Hotel and in 1934, a major extension including an assembly hall was built. Further extensions included the Hatfield building in the 1960s, the Edinburgh Dome in 1977 and The Science Education Centre in 1998.

St James's School was founded in the south of England by twin sisters Alice and Katrine Baird in 1896 and moved to the large mansion of Lord Howard de Walden in West Malvern in 1902. The Abbey School was founded in Blockley, Worcestershire and moved to Malvern in 1897 and to Malvern Wells in 1908. Two of the Baird sisters, Diana and Alice, ran the two houses for students: the Junior House, for the girls aged 11–14, and the Senior House for girls above 14. "The Miss Bairds were remarkable: five spinster sisters all over six feet tall and all to be Head Mistresses." The girls wore a simple uniform: white cotton shirts, navy blue coats and skirts. "There were no 'O Levels' or 'A Levels' in those days, and exams were not taken seriously. 'Citizenship' was what the Miss Bairds were most anxious to instill; it must be admitted with considerable success--many girls were later notable for lives of public service."

The merger
In 1979 the two schools merged on the West Malvern campus of St James and the resulting school was named St James's & The Abbey. In 1994 Lawnside School, which was founded around 1856, merged with St James's & The Abbey School and the school was renamed St James's. In 2006, Malvern Girls' College merged with St James's School and was refounded as Malvern St James (MSJ).

Teaching
On 16 May 2019, it emerged that staff had been teaching the wrong book for one of their English Literature International GCSE papers, after students opened the exam and found no questions relating to the book Spies by Michael Frayn, which they had been studying for two years. One parent said, “It has been a complete utter waste of time for two years.” The school apologised and launched an investigation into the incident, and begged the exam board Cambridge International for 'special consideration'.

Malvern St James received the highest rating of 'Excellent' in the independent schools Inspectorate Educational Quality Inspection, published in May 2017.

Structure and academic results 
The school is divided into four areas MSJ Pre-Prep (Reception to Year 2), MSJ Prep (Year 3 to Year 6), MSJ Seniors (Year 7 to Year 11) and MSJ Sixth Form (Year 12 & Year 13).

A-level results 2021: Students achieved 43% of grades at A*, 75% at A*-A, 90% at A*-B and 98% at A*-C.

GCSE results 2021: 32% of the entries were graded 9; 54% 9-8; and 74% 9-7.

A-level results 2020: Students achieved 31% of grades at A*, 67% at A*-A, 87% at A*-B and 97% at A*-C.

GCSE results 2020: 57% of entries scored a 9-8 or A* grades; 77% of entries scored 9-7/A*-A grades and 99.5% of entries scored 9-4 or A*-C. 41% of girls gained a clean sweep in grades 9-7 or A*-A.

A-level results 2019: 44% of grades were at A* and A, and more than one in six students achieved a clean sweep of A* and A grades.

GCSE results 2019: 38% of entries scored a 9-8 or A* grades; and 55% of entries scored 9-7/A*-A grades.

Boarding houses 
The school offers full, weekly or flexi boarding. All girls whether they are boarders or day girls are a part of the boarding community. There are five boarding houses each dedicated to caring for a specific age group: Batsford, Benhams, Mount, Poulton and Greenslade.

Architecture

The Imperial Hotel

Following the collapse of the spa industry, many of the hotels were acquired for use as private boarding schools, and education became the basis of Malvern's economy; the Imperial Hotel was purchased by the school in 1919. The former hotel is directly opposite Great Malvern railway station, with its dedicated (now derelict) tunnel to the basement of the building, which is clearly visible from both platforms of the station. The red brick and stone Imperial Hotel, which had been the largest in Malvern during the town's heyday as a spa in the second half of the 19th century, is still one of the largest buildings in Malvern and was built in 1860 by the architect E. W. Elmslie. He also designed the Great Malvern railway station, the Council House and The Grove in Avenue Road in 1867, originally to be his private residence, which in 1927 became part of the Lawnside School. The Imperial was the first hotel to be lit by incandescent gas. It was equipped with all types of baths and brine was brought specially by rail from Droitwich. In 1934 the building was extended with the addition of the York Hall, officially opened by Queen Elizabeth The Queen Mother.

The Edinburgh Dome

The school campus has a listed sports hall – The Edinburgh Dome, so named as it was unveiled by the Duke of Edinburgh. It consists of a round, green, balloon-shaped building, containing squash courts, a gym area and a games area, surrounded by a moat. Based on an innovative roof construction by Dante Bini, the Binishell (or Parashell), it was built in 1977 by architect Michael Godwin and consultant engineer John Faber. It was opened in 1978. On the advice of English Heritage it has been designated a Grade II listed building.

Fees
As of the 2021-22 academic year, fees at the school range from £2,550 to £13,470 per term.

Alumnae

Malvern St James Girls' School 

 Hon. Beryl Cozens Hardy OBE (1911-2011) first British woman to chair the committee of the World Association of Girl Guides and Girl Scouts from 1972-1975
 Jennifer Kirby, television and stage actress
 Iskra Lawrence, model, activist, and one of the BBC's 100 Women

Malvern Girls' College

 Mary Hayley Bell (1911-2005), playwright and author of Whistle Down the Wind
 Barbara Cartland (1901-2000), novelist
 Jane Davidson, minister for environment and sustainability in Wales from 2007 to 2011
 Melanie Dawes, economist and civil servant
 Imogen Edwards-Jones , author of 'Hotel Babylon'
 Manya Harari (1905 – 1969) Russian born British translator of Russian literature and the co-founder of Harvill Press
 Peggy Jay (1913-2008), politician  and campaigner, attended briefly
 Anna Kavan (1901-1968), novelist, author and painter
 Dorothy King, archaeologist and author
 Elizabeth Lane (1905-1988), first female high court judge
 Caroline Lucas, MP, leader of the Green Party 2008–2010
 Frances Lynn, English journalist
 Sara Murray, British entrepreneur and businesswoman
 Donna Ong, Singapore-based artist
 Joanna Van Gyseghem, actress
 Tania Long (1913-1998), German-born Canadian/American WWII journalist

Lawnside

 Phyllida Lloyd, Director of "Mamma Mia"

St James’s, West Malvern
Princess Alice, Duchess of Gloucester (1901-2004)
Penelope Lyttelton, Viscountess Cobham, businesswoman
Dame Clara Furse, Chief Executive (retired) of the London Stock Exchange
Penelope Leach, childcare expert

The Abbey School 

 Professor Ursula Martin, computer scientist

Notable staff
Rear Admiral Rodney Sturdee, bursar of Malvern Girls' College, 1972–1985

References

Further reading
 
 

   ASIN: B0000CMFA4

External links
Malvern St James official website
 
Independent Schools Inspectorate (ISI)
Malvern St James Girls' School profile at The Good Schools Guide

See also
List of independent schools in the United Kingdom

Boarding schools in Worcestershire
Educational institutions established in 1893
Girls' schools in Worcestershire
Private schools in Worcestershire
Schools in Malvern, Worcestershire
1893 establishments in England
Member schools of the Girls' Schools Association
Member schools of the Independent Schools Association (UK)